Marcus Nathanson (1793 – 10 June 1868) was a Russian Jewish scholar. He devoted himself to the study of ancient Hebrew literature, publishing the following works: Kontres ayyelet ha-shaḥar, critical notes on certain chapters of the Midrash Tehillim (printed in Pirḥe tzafon, ii. 165–180); Mikhtav 'al devar shemot anashim, on Jewish proper names (ib. pp. 181–186); and a study on the Karaites (in Günzburg's Devir, Vilna, 1864).

References
 

1793 births
1868 deaths
Hebraists
Jews from the Russian Empire
People from Telšiai
People from Vilna Governorate
People from Vilnius